was the first son of Emperor Go-Daigo of Japan. He fought for his father in the Nanboku-chō Wars. Since the characters used to write "Takanaga" can also be read as "Takayoshi", the prince is sometimes known by that name as well.

Appointed Seitō Shōgun (Commander-in-Chief of the Defense of the East) in November 1335, he was commissioned along with Nitta Yoshisada to destroy the Northern Court leaders Ashikaga Takauji and Ashikaga Tadayoshi. 

He fought a number of battles alongside Nitta and led his own force in besieging Kyoto in 1336.

In 1336, he was sent along with his brother Tsunenaga to be escorted by Nitta Yoshisada to Echizen Province where, it was hoped, they could escape the attacks of the Ashikaga. They made it to the stronghold of Kanagasaki. In January 1337 the castle came under siege, and by April those inside were reduced to eating horseflesh to survive, and almost resorted to cannibalism before surrendering. Takanaga and Nitta Yoshiaki committed suicide as the castle fell.

See also
Kanegasaki-gū

References

1310 births
1337 deaths
Japanese princes
Suicides by seppuku
Sons of emperors